AWG is an abbreviation for American wire gauge

AWG may also refer to:

In science and technology:
 Arbitrary waveform generator, a piece of electronic test equipment used to generate electrical waveforms
 Arrayed waveguide grating, in telecommunications, an optical (de)multiplexing device
 Atmospheric water generator, a device that extracts water from humid air
Anthropocene Working Group, a research group dedicated to the study of the Anthropocene as a geological time unit

Businesses and organizations:
 Anglian Water Group, a British water company
 Association for Women Geoscientists
 Associated Wholesale Grocers
 Australian Writers' Guild

Other uses:
 American Winery Guide, a compendium of wineries in the United States
 Arctic Winter Games, an international biennial sports competition
 Aruban guilder, the currency of Aruba by ISO 4217 code
 Asymmetric Warfare Group, a unit of the United States Army which crafts doctrine for asymmetric warfare